Riguepeu is a commune in Gers, France.

Geography

Population

See also
Communes of the Gers department

References

Communes of Gers